Philomycus virginicus, common name the Virginia mantleslug, is a species of air-breathing land slug, a terrestrial pulmonate gastropod mollusk in the family Philomycidae.

Anatomy
These slugs create and use love darts as part of their mating behavior.

References

Philomycidae
Gastropods described in 1953